Dhopapara Memorial Degree College is located at Dhopapara in Puthia, Rajshahi. It was established in 1996. It is a college that provides Honours degrees at undergraduate level and H. S. C at Higher secondary level .

References

External links
 Education Board Result
 Rajshahi Education Board

Educational institutions established in 1996
Universities and colleges in Rajshahi District
Colleges in Rajshahi District
1996 establishments in Bangladesh